The 1912 Rhode Island gubernatorial election was held on November 5, 1912. Incumbent Republican Aram J. Pothier defeated Democratic nominee Theodore F. Green with 43.67% of the vote.

General election

Candidates
Major party candidates
Aram J. Pothier, Republican
Theodore F. Green, Democratic

Other candidates
Albert H. Humes, Progressive
Samuel H. Fassel, Socialist
Willis H. White, Prohibition
Thomas F. Herrick, Socialist Labor

Results

References

1912
Rhode Island
Gubernatorial